Raghav Juyal (born 10 July 1991) is an Indian dancer, choreographer, actor and television presenter. He is known as the "King of Slow Motion" for his surreal dance moves in slow motion style and for his reinvention of the "Slow Motion Walk" in India. He rose to fame after being a contestant and finalist in Zee TV's dance reality show Dance India Dance 3 and a skipper for the team "Raghav Ke Rockstars" in Dance India Dance Li'l Masters 2 and Dance Ke Superkids where his team was declared the winner under his captainship. He was a contestant on Fear Factor: Khatron Ke Khiladi 7 (2016).

Career

Dance India Dance (season 3)
Juyal became known when his audition video went viral on YouTube. He was a contestant on  Dance India Dance 3 (2012), which aired on Zee TV. He was not professionally trained by anyone prior to coming on the show. Juyal showcased a new dance style but wasn't selected in the Top 18 by the Grand Master in Mega Audition. Later, on public demand, Grand Master Mithun Chakraborty made an exception in the format by reintroducing him on the show as his "Trump Card" in the Wild Card round, through which he entered the competition again.

Thereafter, Juyal created different dance-forms and reached the finale. He was the most popular contestant of the season having garnered the most No. 1 positions in weekly voting. At the Grand finale, he was voted with  votes in the 2nd runner up position.

DID Li'L Masters (season 2)

After DID, Raghav became the skipper of team Raghav Ke Rockstars in DID Li'l masters (season 2) where he choreographed for Saumya Rai and Rohan Parkdale. He was the only skipper to lead both of his students to the Grand finale, in which Rohan and Saumya attained 2nd and 3rd runner up positions respectively.

Dance Ke Superkids

Raghav then choreographed for Zee TV's show Dance Ke Superkids as the Captain of DID Li'l Masters (season 2) team Yahoo and competed against DID Li'l Masters (season 1) team Wakao – with Dharmesh Yelande as the Captain. In the Grand Finale, his team was declared the winner.

2014–present
In 2014, Juyal debuted as an actor by playing a pivotal role in the comedy film Sonali Cable, co-starring Rhea Chakraborty and Ali Fazal, produced by Ramesh Sippy Entertainment which was released on 17 October 2014. One reviewer singled out Raghav's vivacious performance and praised his screen presence, while another says he "steals every scene he's in" and another says he is "better than the leads". The next year he starred in the dance film, ABCD 2, which was released on 19 June 2015, directed by Remo D'Souza co-starring Varun Dhawan and Shraddha Kapoor.
Later, he also hosted the dance reality show Dance Plus which aired on Star Plus. In the same year, he co-hosted Prem Ki Diwali along with Karishma Tanna which was broadcast on Life Ok.

In 2016, he was seen in Khatron Ke Khiladi season 7 as a contestant which aired on Colors TV. Later, he hosted Dance Plus (season 2). In the same year, he also co-hosted and appeared on Star Parivaar Awards and Colors Golden Petal Awards. Later he hosted and performed on the show, Timeless Aisha which was aired on Zee Classic.
The following year he co-hosted the singing reality show, Rising Star along with Meiyang Chang which aired on Colors TV. In mid 2017 he has hosted Dance Plus (season 3). In the same year, he began co-hosting the dance reality show, Dance Champions with Ridhima Pandit.

In 2018, he co-hosted the second season of the singing reality show, Dil Hai Hindustani along with Mukti Mohan. He then starred in the romantic comedy film, Nawabzaade along with Dharmesh Yelande, Punit Pathak and Isha Rikhi directed by Jayesh Pradhan which was released on 27 July 2018. Later in the year, he co-hosted Dance Plus (season 4) along with Sugandha Mishra. In 2019, he hosted the dance reality show Dance Plus (season 5).

In 2020, he appeared in dance film Street Dancer 3D with Varun Dhawan, Shraddha Kapoor, Prabhu Deva, and Nora Fatehi. Then he appeared in the second season of the Zee5 dark crime thriller series Abhay (TV series) directed by Ken Ghosh, which was released  on 14 August 2020, playing the negative dark character for the first time. He played the lead role in the satirical comedy film Bahut Hua Samman  produced by Yoodlee films and directed by Ashish R. Shukla, shared screen space with Sanjay Misra. The movie was released on 2 October 2020 on Disney+ Hotstar due to COVID-19 pandemic and received positive reviews from the audience and critics. Raghav next starred opposite Ankita Sharma in a romantic movie titled Wedlock directed by Sachin Karande and the film is Produced by Blue Orchid Entertainment and Creo Brains Motion Pictures, the shoot was completed in various locations of Mumbai in 25 days shoot schedule. The film is set to release in August 2021

On 15 February 2021, Farhan Akhtar dropped the first teaser of his new film, and announced Yudhra to be produced by his company, Excel Entertainment. Raghav along with Siddhant Chaturvedi and Malavika Mohanan. The film is directed by Ravi Udyawar.Yudhra's story and screenplay have been penned jointly by Farhan Akhtar and Shridhar Raghavan. The film is slated to release in summer 2022.

Influences :
His signature step is Slow Motion Walk. Choreographers like geeta kapoor & Remo D'Souza and Terrence Lewis have stated that they had never seen anyone emulate the slow motion walk in India, as realistically, before Raghav. Raghav is a trained actor, mentored by the actor and acting coach Saurabh Sachdeva.

Personal life
Raghav Juyal was born to Deepak Juyal, an advocate, and Alka Bakshi Juyal, his mother is a Punjabi. He was born and brought up in Dehradun, Uttarakhand. Born in a Garhwali family he belongs to his ancestral village Khetu in Uttarakhand.

Juyal never had any formal training in dance but picked it up from watching performances from the internet and television. He started winning laurels as a dancer right from his days in Doon International School. Later, he joined DAV (PG) College to pursue his B.Com.

Filmography

Films

Television

Music videos

Web series

See also
 List of dancers

References

External links

 
 

1991 births
Living people
Popping dancers
Male actors from Dehradun
Indian male dancers
Indian male television actors
Hemwati Nandan Bahuguna Garhwal University alumni
Dancers from Uttarakhand
21st-century Indian male actors
21st-century Indian dancers
Garhwali people
Fear Factor: Khatron Ke Khiladi participants